Strathpine railway station is located on the North Coast line in Queensland, Australia. It serves the suburb of Strathpine in the Moreton Bay Region. In 2001, a third platform opened as part of the addition of a third track from Bald Hills to Lawnton.

Services
Strathpine is served by all City network services from Kippa-Ring to Roma Street, many continuing to Springfield Central

Services by platform

Transport links
Thompsons Bus Service operates one route via Strathpine station:
670: Strathpine Centre to Warner

References

External links

Strathpine station Queensland Rail
Strathpine station Queensland's Railways on the Internet

Railway stations in Moreton Bay Region
Shire of Pine Rivers
North Coast railway line, Queensland